Opsariichthys hieni is a species of cyprinid in the genus Opsariichthys. It inhabits Vietnam. It is not considered harmful to humans.

References

Cyprinid fish of Asia
IUCN Red List data deficient species
Taxa named by Nguyen Thia Tu
Fish described in 1987